William Lance Swan (born May 12, 1942) is an American country singer-songwriter, best known for his 1974 single "I Can Help".

Biography 
Swan was born in Cape Girardeau, Missouri, United States.  As a child, he learned drums, piano and guitar, and began writing songs. His first big break was in 1962 when Clyde McPhatter recorded "Lover Please", a song written by Swan when he was in a local band called Mirt Mirly & the Rhythm Steppers, who had first recorded the song on Bill Black's Louis label. McPhatter's version quickly became a No. 7 pop hit.

Swan moved to Memphis, Tennessee, to work with Black, but this was cut short with Black's illness and subsequent death in 1965.  It was rumored that Swan worked as a security guard at Graceland. While he was friends with one of the security guards he never worked at Graceland. He then moved to Nashville, Tennessee, which enabled him to write hit country songs for numerous artists, including Conway Twitty, Waylon Jennings, and Mel Tillis.  In 1969, Swan first took on the role of record producer, producing Tony Joe White's Top Ten hit "Polk Salad Annie". Swan also played bass guitar for Kris Kristofferson and then signed a solo recording deal with Monument Records.

Swan moved to Nashville in 1972 and cut his first album, Rock on With Rhythm, which included the track "Lover Please". The album budget was only $19,000, and had been declared pre-release by a music business professional hired by the president of Monument Records, Fred Foster, that there were no hits on the record. However,  "I Can Help", proved this wrong, recorded in 1974 at Young'un Sound in Murfreesboro, Tennessee. It was a rockabilly number that topped the Billboard Hot 100 as well as the US and Canadian country charts in 1974, also becoming a hit in many other countries.

Swan wrote the song on an RMI organ that Kristofferson and singer Rita Coolidge had bought for him as a wedding gift. However, the RMI organ wasn't used on the final recording, contrary to popular belief, it was actually a portable Farfisa from Bobby Emmons, a Memphis session musician. Swan recalls, "Chip set up a vocal mic, I stood in front of the organ, and what you hear was captured on the second take." The lyrics were written in under twenty minutes. It was recorded in two takes (without overdubs), and co-produced/engineered by the owner of the recording studio, Chip Young. The label pushed for "The Ways of a Woman in Love" to be the single, but Young insisted the hit was "I Can Help". However, other albums with Monument, A&M, and Epic did not have nearly the success of "I Can Help".

In 1979, Swan traveled to Havana, Cuba, to participate in the historic Havana Jam festival that took place March 2–4, alongside Stephen Stills, the CBS Jazz All-Stars, the Trio of Doom, Fania All-Stars, Weather Report, Bonnie Bramlett, Mike Finnegan, Kris Kristofferson, Rita Coolidge, and Billy Joel, plus an array of Cuban artists such as Irakere, Pacho Alonso, Tata Güines, and Orquesta Aragón. His performance is captured on Ernesto Juan Castellanos's documentary Havana Jam '79.

Swan continued to tour as a member of Kristofferson's band and recorded with Randy Meisner of The Eagles. In 1986, he entered a California studio (Bench Records) as part of a band called Black Tie and along with Meisner, Jimmy Griffin (Bread), David Kemper (drummer), David Miner, and David Mansfield recorded an album called When the Night Falls.  He recorded another solo album, Like Elvis Used to Do in 2000, and another Black Tie-style album with Meisner and Charlie Rich, Jr. billed as "Meisner, Swan & Rich". , Swan remained a backing singer and session musician.

Personal life 
Swan was married to his late wife Marlu for 30 years. Marlu died on February 12, 2003, from cancer. They had two daughters, recording artists Planet Swan and Sierra Swan.

Discography

Albums

Singles

See also
List of artists who reached number one in the United States
List of 1970s one-hit wonders in the United States
List of artists who reached number one on the Australian singles chart
List of performers on Top of the Pops

References

External links
Interview with Billy Swan
Yahoo! Music biography
Billy Swan at Rockabilly
Billy Swan at Discogs

1942 births
Living people
American male singer-songwriters
American country rock singers
People from Cape Girardeau, Missouri
American session musicians
American country singer-songwriters
Monument Records artists
Red Baron Records artists
Singer-songwriters from Missouri
Country musicians from Missouri
Black Tie (band) members